Robert Clifford (8 March 1752 – 18 April 1811) was an English cricketer who played in 71 first-class cricket matches between 1777 and 1792.

Despite having a deformed right hand caused by a childhood accident, Clifford was an effective leg break bowler who bowled right-arm slow underarm deliveries. Arthur Haygarth, writing in the mid-19th century, noted his attention to detail when bowling. He was a left-handed batsman who was recognised as an all-rounder.

Clifford mainly played for Kent sides, which he made 31 appearances for, as well as both East and West Kent sides and those put together by leading Kent patrons of the day Sir Horatio Mann and John Bligh, 4th Earl of Darnley. He also played 19 times for England sides, for Hampshire sides and for the White Conduit Club and the Marylebone Cricket Club. James Pycroft, writing in 1862, described him as one of Kent's three best players.

Clifford was born at Bearsted in Kent in 1752 and died there in 1811 aged 59. Two of his grandsons, William Clifford and Francis Clifford, also played cricket for Kent teams.

Notes

References

External links
 

English cricketers
English cricketers of 1701 to 1786
Kent cricketers
1752 births
1811 deaths
People from Bearsted
Hampshire cricketers
Marylebone Cricket Club cricketers
White Conduit Club cricketers
English cricketers of 1787 to 1825
Left-Handed v Right-Handed cricketers
West Kent cricketers
East Kent cricketers